Marco Arop (born September 20, 1998) is a Canadian track and field athlete competing in the middle distance events. He currently holds a personal best of 1:43:26 in the 800 m. He is the 2022 World bronze medallist and the 2019 Pan American champion in that discipline. Arop represented Canada at the 2020 Summer Olympics.

Early life 
The Arop family fled Sudan during the civil war of the 1990s when Marco was a toddler. He spent his early years sharing an apartment in Egypt with his parents and three older brothers before they immigrated to Canada. The family initially lived in Saskatoon, Saskatchewan, before taking up residence in Edmonton, Alberta. Arop's initial athletic focus was basketball. He was offered a scholarship by Concordia University of Edmonton but switched his focus to track upon the recommendation of his high school basketball coach, who would later admit, "I had no idea that Marco was going to be this good."

Competitive career 
Arop competed for Mississippi State in the 2018 NCAA Division I Outdoor Track and Field 800m in Eugene, Oregon, finishing in second place. He won the gold medal in the 800 m at the 2019 Pan American Games, setting a new Pan American record in the process. He then made his World Championship debut at the 2019 edition in Doha. Qualifying to the final of the 800 m, he finished seventh. After the World Championships, Arop decided to end his amateur career and turn professional full-time, though the onset of the COVID-19 pandemic meant that the 2020 athletic season was largely cancelled.

In 2021, Arop competed in his first full professional season, making his first Diamond League podium with a silver medal at the BAUHAUS-galan in Stockholm. Named to his first Olympic team, Arop competed in the 800 m event at the 2020 Summer Olympics in Tokyo. Entering the race as a podium contender, he finished seventh in his semi-final. He did not advance to the event final, a major disappointment that he and his coaches attributed to a longstanding habit of starting too quickly, resulting in fading toward the end of the race. In his next event that season, the Prefontaine Classic on the 2021 Diamond League circuit, Arop claimed the gold medal ahead of the reigning Olympic gold and silver medallists, Emmanuel Korir and Ferguson Rotich. Five days later, at the Athletissima in Lausanne, Arop again defeated Korir and Rotich to claim his second Diamond League gold. Arop's results qualified him to the Diamond League Final in Zürich, where he finished in fourth place.

Arop began 2022 with this debut at the World Athletics Indoor Championships at the 2022 edition in Belgrade. He once again started a race hard and was leading the 800 m at the halfway point, but faded badly down the stretch and finished in eighth place. On the 2022 Diamond League, Arop won his third Diamond League gold, and first of the season, at the British Grand Prix in Birmingham. The following month, he won another Canadian national title, besting silver medallist Brandon McBride by almost a full second. In an invitational event held at Foote Field weeks before the 2022 World Athletics Championships, he ran the 800 m in 1:43.61, the third-best time for any athlete that year to date. Arop had the fastest time in the heats of the 800 m in Eugene, Oregon, advancing to the semi-finals. He was second in his semi-final, passed just at the line by Algerian Slimane Moula, and secured automatic qualification to the final. Looking ahead, Arop said, "it's been a great first two rounds, but if I can't get it done in the final, I won't feel like I completed anything." Racing a 1:44.28 time in the final, Arop won the bronze medal, only the second medal for a Canadian in the 800 m at the World Championships. Arop said this medal "means the world" and was "already looking forward to bigger and better next year." Appearing in the 1000 m event at the Herculis meet in Monaco, he set a new national record time of 2:14.35, breaking a decade-old best of Nathan Brannen's.

Competition record

Championship results

Circuit wins
Diamond League 
Birmingham: 2022 (800 m)
Eugene: 2021 (800 m)
Lausanne: 2021 (800 m)

References

External links 
 

1998 births
Living people
Canadian male middle-distance runners
Canadian people of Sudanese descent
Black Canadian track and field athletes
Sudanese emigrants to Canada
People from Khartoum
Athletes (track and field) at the 2019 Pan American Games
Athletes (track and field) at the 2020 Summer Olympics
Medalists at the 2019 Pan American Games
Mississippi State Bulldogs men's track and field athletes
Olympic track and field athletes of Canada
Pan American Games gold medalists for Canada
Pan American Games gold medalists in athletics (track and field)
Pan American Games medalists in athletics (track and field)
Pan American Games track and field athletes for Canada